Notre Dame High School, also known as Notre Dame Green Pond, is a private, Roman Catholic high school in Easton, Pennsylvania in the Lehigh Valley region of eastern Pennsylvania. It is located within the Roman Catholic Diocese of Allentown.

As of the 2021-22 school year, the school had an enrollment of 494 students, according to National Center for Education Statistics data.

Background
The school has students from four surrounding Pennsylvania counties and two counties in New Jersey. It has a broad socioeconomic background and varies in character from urban to suburban. The community is mostly residential with several commercial and light industrial areas. Notre Dame offers the Aquinas Program, which offers education to children with learning disabilities.

The school also has several international students.

Activities and athletics

Notre Dame competes within the Colonial League and District XI. They are noted for their strong athletics programs. They are rivals with neighboring Wilson Area High School. They field the following varsity sports in the boys' category: football, soccer, cross country, golf, basketball, wrestling, tennis, track, baseball, and have an agreement with local Moravian Academy to let Notre Dame students play lacrosse and field hockey for them. Notre Dame also fields girls' volleyball, cross country, tennis basketball, soccer, track, and softball.

Notable alumni
Marco Andretti, professional race car driver
Kristen McMenamy, supermodel
Niki and Gabi, singers and actresses
Alfred A. Schlert, Roman Catholic Diocese of Allentown bishop

Notes and references

External links
Official website
Notre Dame High School athletics
Notre Dame High School at Facebook
Notre Dame-Green Pond High School Varsity Football at MaxPreps
Notre Dame High School sports coverage at The Express-Times

Catholic secondary schools in Pennsylvania
Easton, Pennsylvania
Private high schools in the Lehigh Valley
Schools in Northampton County, Pennsylvania